Diego Omar López Centurión (born 5 June 1982), better known as Diego Centurión, is a Paraguayan professional footballer who plays as a striker for Sportivo Luqueño, from the Paraguayan Primera División.

Club career

Early life 
Diego Centurión was born in Caaguazú, Paraguay, where he was the fourth of seven children from a poor family. He arrived at Atlético Caaguazú, where one of his older brothers was playing, at age 14. Even at that age he debuted in the first team, that was champion of the local tournament. Immediately was seen by a businessman called Epifanio Rojas, who took him to Tembetary, by then playing in the Second Division. He made his professional debut in 1998, at age 16.

Europe and serious injury 
That same year was transferred to Serie A team A.S. Roma, where he was six months until he suffered a torn ligament in his knee, after a strong collision with teammate Cafu, during a training session.

Centurión was loaned to Udinese, where he underwent surgery. After that, he was sent to Germany to continue his rehabilitation, which once completed, it allowed him to return to the Italian football.

References 

Living people
1982 births
Paraguayan footballers
Association football forwards
Sportivo Luqueño players
People from Caaguazú Department